Meagan Alexandra Morris (born May 11, 1992) is an American soccer player from Montclair, New Jersey who played for Portland Thorns FC of the NWSL. Morris was a member of the United States under-20 women's national soccer team, and plays the position of midfielder.

Early life
Morris was born and raised in Montclair, New Jersey.

Playing career

College

North Carolina Tar Heels
Morris attended the University of North Carolina from 2010 to 2013 where she was a three-year starter.

Youth international

Professional

Sky Blue FC
Morris was signed in April 2014 as a discovery player. She was waived by the club in July 2015 to make room on the roster for Australian national team players returning from the World Cup.

Portland Thorns FC
The Thorns signed Morris on April 27, 2016. She scored her first professional goal on May 21, 2016, as a substitute against the Washington Spirit. During a match against the Western New York Flash on June 17, 2016, she fractured her hip during play and missed the remainder of the 2016 season and most of the 2017 season while recovering.

See also

 2010 FIFA U-20 Women's World Cup squads

References

External links
 Meg Morris profile at National Women's Soccer League
 Meg Morris profile at Portland Thorns FC
 Meg Morris profile at Sky Blue FC
 University of North Carolina player profile
 Sky Blue FC press release

1992 births
Living people
American women's soccer players
NJ/NY Gotham FC players
National Women's Soccer League players
Women's association football midfielders
Portland Thorns FC players
United States women's under-20 international soccer players
North Carolina Tar Heels women's soccer players
African-American women's soccer players
21st-century African-American sportspeople
21st-century African-American women